Mario Gargano (20 May 1929 - 11 July 2018) was an Italian politician who served as a Deputy from 1972 to 1983.

References

1929 births
2018 deaths
Deputies of Legislature VI of Italy
Deputies of Legislature VII of Italy
Deputies of Legislature VIII of Italy
Christian Democracy (Italy) members of the Chamber of Deputies (Italy)
People from the Province of L'Aquila